IKK may refer to:
 IκB kinase, an enzyme
 Greater Kankakee Airport
 Ikk (film), a 2021 Indian film